A special administrative region is a designation for types of administrative division in China, East Timor, Indonesia, and North Korea.

China
Special administrative regions of China
Hong Kong
Macau
Wolong National Nature Reserve

East Timor
Oecusse

Indonesia
Aceh
Special Region of Yogyakarta

North Korea
Sinuiju Special Administrative Region
Mount Kumgang Tourist Region

Types of administrative division